Melanodexia grandis is a species of cluster fly in the family Polleniidae.

Distribution
United States.

References

Polleniidae
Insects described in 1926
Diptera of North America